The Sergeant is a 1968 American drama film directed by John Flynn and starring Rod Steiger and John Phillip Law. It was released by Warner Bros.-Seven Arts.

Plot
A dedicated, decorated war veteran, Master Sergeant Callan, is posted in France at a fuel supply depot in 1952. Finding a lack of discipline under the frequently drunk Capt. Loring, he takes charge in a tough, no-nonsense manner.

But distracting the sergeant is a physical attraction to one of his men, Private First Class Thomas Swanson, that seems at odds with everything in Callan's personality. He makes Swanson his orderly and befriends him socially, but behind his back scares off Solange, the private's girlfriend.

Callan's confusion and depression grows and he begins to drink. Unable to resist the urge, the sergeant attempts to kiss Swanson and is violently warded off. He turns up for morning formation hungover and Loring relieves him of duty. Callan goes off to a nearby woods alone, rifle in hand, and commits suicide.

Cast
Rod Steiger as MSgt. Albert Callan
John Phillip Law as Pfc. Tom Swanson
Ludmila Mikaël as Solange
Frank Latimore as Capt. Loring 
Elliott Sullivan as Pop Henneken

Production
In 1966, Robert Wise set up a company to produce low-budget films that others would direct. He optioned Dennis Murphy's novel The Sergeant and hired his former assistant, John Flynn, to direct. Flynn says Simon Oakland badly wanted to play the lead, but so did Rod Steiger, who was in much demand at the time, and Steiger played it for less than his usual fee.

Reception
On review aggregator website Rotten Tomatoes, the film has a 20% approval rank based on 5 reviews.

Vincent Canby of The New York Times called The Sergeant a "worth seeing [film]", adding to it that "even when you're running ahead of it, anticipating its crises and climaxes as if they were stops on the BMT".

Legacy
The film was excerpted in the documentary film The Celluloid Closet (1996).

See also
List of American films of 1968
Reflections in a Golden Eye (1967)

References

External links
The Sergeant at IMDB
The Sergeant at TCM Database

1968 directorial debut films
1968 drama films
1968 LGBT-related films
American drama films
American LGBT-related films
Films about sexual repression
Films about the United States Army
Films based on American novels
Films directed by John Flynn
Films set in 1952
Films set in Paris
LGBT-related drama films
Warner Bros. films
1960s English-language films
1960s American films